The professional world rankings for the 1988–89 season are listed below.

Being ranked in the top 16 exempted players from the qualifying rounds for the World Snooker Championship and also meant inclusion in certain invitational events. The top 32 ranked players were exempt from the early qualifying rounds of the other ranking tournaments.

The top three players in the snooker world rankings 1987/1988 kept the same positions this season. Steve Davis was ranked first, with 59 points, ahead of Jimmy White with 44 and Neal Foulds with 34. In fourth place, with 33 points, was Stephen Hendry, who rose from 23rd position on the previous year's list. The other players to join the elite "top 16" were Peter Francisco, John Virgo, and Cliff Wilson. The players dropping out of the top 16 were Alex Higgins, Rex Williams, Dean Reynolds and Doug Mountjoy.

Higgins had been banned from competing in the first two ranking tournaments of the 1987/1988 season, and this was the first year since the rankings were instituted in 1976/1977 that he was not among the top 16. In May 1988, Cliff Thorburn had two ranking points deducted for "bringing the game into disrepute" due to failing a drugs test at the 1988 British Open. Thorburn had been found to have small traces of cocaine in his urine sample. Thorburn was also barred from the first two ranking events of the 1988/1989 season as part of his punishment. Without the deduction of the two points, Thorburn would have been ranked a place higher, at fifth.

Of the players who had only been competing professionally for one season, Martin Clark was the highest-ranked, at 41st.

Tournaments contributing to the rankings 
The tournaments contributing to the 1988/89 rankings were the ranking tournaments held across two seasons, from 1986 to 1988. From the 1986–87 season they were the 1986 International Open won by Foulds; the 1986 Grand Prix and 1987 British Open both won by White; and the 1986 UK Championship, 1987 Classic and 1987 World Championship all won by Davis.

In the 1987–88 season, Davis won four of the six ranking titles: the 1987 International Open, 1987 UK Championship, 1988 Classic and the 1988 World Championship. Stephen Hendry won the other two, the 1987 Grand Prix and the 1988 British Open.

Points tariff 
The rankings were based on a system of points as per the tables below. Ranking was determined on points earned over the preceding two seasons. The ranking order was determined as follows:
Most points
If a tie on points, the player who earned more points in the most recent season was given the higher ranking
If still a tie, the player with more "Merit" points" was given the higher ranking
If still a tie, the player who earned more "Merit" points was the most recent season is given the higher ranking
If still a tie, the player who earned more "Merit" points was the most preceding season is given the higher ranking
If still a tie, the player with more "A" points" was given the higher ranking
If still a tie, the player with more frames won was given the higher ranking
If still a tie, the player with the better performance in the previous World Championship was given the higher ranking
If still a tie, the player with the better performance in the previous ranking tournament was given the higher ranking, going back through ranking tournaments until the positions could be established.

Rankings

Notes

References

1988
Rankings 1989
Rankings 1988